Konstantin Fedorovich von Schulz was a Russian captain during the Russo-Japanese War. He was one of the closest assistants of Stepan Makarov throughout the war and participated in the first two voyages of the Yermak. He died during the sinking of the  after it was struck by a water mine and went down with Makarov. He was also known for inventing the "Schulz Trawl" which was a minesweeper that innovated the usage and the transportation of naval mines.

Family
Born in Kronstadt, Konstantin was the third son in a large family of naval officer Fyodor Bogdanovich von Schultz and his wife Emilia ur. von Voigt (16 January 1832 - 5 May 1889). In addition to two older brothers, Konstantin had four more sisters with only one of whom was born after Konstantin. With the transfer of his father to St. Petersburg, the family settled in house 36 on Sergievskaya Street, where Konstantin studied at the Annenschule.

Early military career 
After graduating from the school, following the example of his older brothers, on September 16, 1881, he entered the Naval Cadet Corps, where he studied in the same class with people such as Academician Aleksey Krylov, Chamberlain, Comrade of the Minister of Trade and Industry,naval officer S. P. Veselago, flagship artilleryman A. K. Myakishev and Admiral Ludwig Kerber whom Konstantin had a friendship with the latter. At the school, Konstantin was not particularly successful, but he attracted attention due to his dexterity and resourcefulness during training voyages. In his memoirs, Aleksey Krylov describes a case when, during an artillery salute in honor of the Practical Squadron of Alexander III, one sailor at the last moment prevented an accidental combat shot in the direction of the emperor's yacht and the sailor was Konstantin. He graduated as midshipman in His Imperial Highness General-Admiral's 1st Naval crew on October 1, 1884.

Circumnavigation on the Vityaz
In 1885, under the leadership of Stepan Makarov, Konstantin was assigned to the Vityaz which was under construction. That year, Stepan Osipovich recruited a crew for an unusual voyage. The round-the-world trip, which the command initially considered it as an ordinary foreign campaign intended for the combat training of the team, turned into a full-fledged scientific expedition while Makarov made the main bet on young initiative officers. Having received a carte blanche from the maritime department, he selected eight people from among the midshipmen of the last two graduates of the Naval Cadet Corps. He knew each personally since he commanded the Practical Squadron of the Baltic Sea, intended for training voyages of pupils and midshipmen of the Naval School.

The Vityaz entered the famous circumnavigation on August 31, 1886. Hydrographic and hydrological studies began from the first day under the program of Makarov. They were carried out both in the Baltic Sea and in the Atlantic but mainly in the Pacific Ocean at the seas of the Far East. Each officer had his own range of duties and his assistants from among the lower ranks. Some observations were made every quarter of an hour, regardless of the weather and time of day. The sailors of the corvette worked especially effectively in the Sea of Japan . The task was formulated as follows: to find places in Russian waters in the Far East that are convenient for organizing fleet bases. Such bays have been found in Peter the Great Bay. The crew of the "Vityaz" decided to celebrate the most distinguished of their comrades. When describing Troitsy Bay, one of the capes was named after Konstantin. Despite another "Cape Schultz" existing, it was often mistaken as also being named after Konstantin as well but it was named in 1863 after his father, Fyodor Bogdanovich.

On the corvette, Konstantin had one more task. Professionally owning photography, in addition to scientific work, he was the main photographer of the trip. An interesting testimony on this subject was left by the former cabin boy N. V. Jenish:

Having completed the journey on the Vityaz, Makarov published an extensive work, which was titled: "The Vityaz and the Pacific Ocean". In it, he paid tribute to all the participants of this historic expedition:

Service in the Far East

Returning to Kronstadt, Makarov didn't forget about his midshipmen. On his initiative, the most distinguished of them were appointed students in the Mine officer classes. At that time, an officer specializing in naval mines was considered in the fleet and Stepan Osipovich himself believed that a future war at sea would be predominantly based on the use of naval mines.

Schultz spent the summer of 1891 sailing along the Gulf of Finland as the commander of the destroyer No. 68 (until 1886, the Seagull). On it, until late autumn, he was engaged in testing Whitehead self-propelled mines, and after that, until the start of the 1892 campaign, he taught at the Kronstadt Mining School for the lower ranks .

In the spring of 1892, Schultz was appointed a mine officer on the 2nd-rank sail-propeller cruiser , where on August 30 he was promoted to lieutenant. Until the fall, the cruiser under the command of the Captain of the 2nd Rank Pavel Ukhtomsky, who was on training navigation in the Baltic Sea, and on October 1 he departed for the Far East, where he became part of the Pacific Squadron. In June 1893, Konstantin Fedorovich had to face a tragic event as in the Sea of Japan, near Port Lazarev, his former ship, the legendary corvette Vityaz, appeared on the rocks [10]. The cruiser Rogue took an active part in the rescue operation, which lasted about a month. All efforts were in vain however as it was impossible to save the ship although most of the equipment was dismantled and brought ashore. A little more time passed and the hull of the corvette was finally smashed against the rocks.

On November 20, 1893, Schultz was awarded the rank of 1st class Mine Officer. A year later, due to the First Sino-Japanese War, an additional small squadron arrived there under the command of Rear Admiral Stepan Makarov. The results obtained were highly appreciated by Makarov and taken into account by him when developing the tactics of the squadron during the Russo-Japanese War.

In July 1895, Schultz returned to the Rogue and in May 1896, returned to Kronstadt . Before Konstantin Fedorovich, Makarov, who again led the Practical Squadron of the Baltic Sea, was there. He insisted that Schultz be appointed as the flagship mine officer on his headquarters.

Schultz and Makarov on the icebreaker "Yermak"
Makarov kept his flag on the battleship Petr Veliky. His headquarters were also located here. In his new position, Schultz began with the fact that, on the instructions of Makarov, developed tactics for the combat interaction of destroyers as part of a squadron. Prior to this, in accordance with the fleet's schedule, the destroyers operated independently as they weren't part of the squadron and were not subordinate to the squadron commander.

In those years, Stepan Makarov was captured by the idea of ​​developing the Northern Sea Route, which he considered the shortest, and most importantly, an independent route to the Far East. Realizing that this idea wasn't feasible without heavy ocean icebreakers, together with his two assistants, captain of the 2nd rank Mikhail Vasiliev and his brother Mikhail Fedorovich von Schultz which were also the only two officers Makarov truly considered to be his students. He developed a detailed technical assignment for the design of the first domestic ocean-going icebreaker. In the summer of 1897, together with Schultz, Makarov undertook a reconnaissance voyage on the steamer Ioann Kronstadt from the port of Vardø, Sweden-Norway through the Barents and Karaseas to the Yenisei. Returning to St. Petersburg, Stepan Osipovich obtained from the government a decision to build a ship, and in November 1897 in the U.K., at the shipyard of the Armstrong Whitworth at Newcastle upon Tyne with the world's Arctic-class first icebreaker Yermak being laid while Mikhail Vasiliev was sent to supervise the construction.

In addition to working on the northern project, Schultz in the same year developed and tested a completely new version of the trawl to combat anchor mines, which was known as the "Schulz trawl".  Its main feature was that the minesweeper was kept at a given depth with the help of buoys and braces. To prevent it from floating up during towing, lead weights were attached to it. The design of the trawl guaranteed against breakages, since its trawling part did not come into contact with the bottom. Trawling speed increased to six knots. The trawl made it possible to tow a mine to a shallow place, where it could float to the surface, it could be shot or blown up with a subversive cartridge. In 1898, the trawl was adopted by Russia. In the case of mine protection, the Schultz trawl constituted an entire era. It would find initial use in the Russo-Japanese War, after which he was adopted by many fleets of the world. The Schulz Trawl was actively used in both the First and Second World Wars.

In the meantime, at the beginning of 1899, the construction of the icebreaker was completed, and on February 21, it left Great Britain for St. Petersburg. Captain 2nd rank Vasiliev was appointed commander of the ship, and Lieutenant K.F. Schultz was appointed senior officer. During the summer of the same year, Yermak made his first two Arctic trips. The scientific part of the expeditions was led by S. O. Makarov. In addition to the duties of a senior officer, Schultz engaged in research work on board the icebreaker and was in charge of the photography. Moreover, especially for this voyage, Konstantin Fedorovich mastered filming and this was the first and quite successful case of using cinematography for scientific purposes in the fleet, Makarov wrote:

Returning from a voyage in the Arctic Ocean, the Yermak from the end of 1899 participated in a multi-month saga to remove the coastal defense battleship General-Admiral Apraksin from the stones of the Gulf of Finland from the stones off of Gogland. The task of the icebreaker was to constantly break the ice around the battleship and ensure the uninterrupted delivery of goods from Reval.

The rescue of the battleship went down in history primarily due to the fact that it was in that year 1900, on January 24, the first practical radio communication session in history was carried out between the island of Gogland and the Finnish Kotka. Schultz took part in all the preparatory activities for the first communication between Alexander Stepanovich Popov and Pyotr Rybkin. At the request of Rybkin from the Yermak, he tried to raise the radio antenna in a balloon. Nothing came of this idea, but when the antenna was installed on the mast and news was received from Kotka, Konstantin temporarily commanded the icebreaker and manage to rescue the fishermen from the ice floe.

For the three campaigns listed, the Yermak became a real favorite of both sailors and people who were very far from the fleet. Makarov and his closest assistants were looked upon as national heroes. They were favored by many state nobles and Nikolai II himself. In May 1900, during a lecture by Makarov about the Yermak Arctic expedition, Lieutenant Schultz was awarded royal gratitude for “indicating views with a magic lantern and cinematography” to the Romanov Family.
The authority of Konstantin Fedorovich rested not only on the imperial location and awards, but above all on the respect of his colleagues. By September 1900, for the first time, by an overwhelming majority, they elected him a mine specialist to the Technical Commission of Kronstadt.

On May 16, 1901, the Ermak set off on his new Arctic voyage. The composition of the expedition changed in many ways, but the main participants remained the same. The route ran from the Baltic, through the North, Norwegian, Greenland and Barents Seas to the northern tip of Novaya Zemlya and further through the Kara Sea to the mouth of the Yenisei. Makarov expected to carry out this expedition with two ocean-going icebreakers, but the government did not allocate money for the construction of the second one. On that voyage, when the Yermak was covered with ice and was especially in dire need of the help of the second icebreaker, in a letter dated June 11, he wrote:

The ambitious plans of Makarov to conquer the Arctic were not destined to come true as due to dense pack ice, it was not possible to break into the Kara Sea from the northern tip of Novaya Zemlya. As a result, the expedition members did not see the islands of Tsivolki, three of which still bear the names of Makarov, Schulz and Vasiliev. Makarov's dream finally came true in 1916, when the icebreaker Svyatogor was launched in Newcastle.

After the icebreaker returned to St. Petersburg, Makarov's rivals called his expedition as a failure and ensured that the Yermak was taken out of his control. As a consequence of this, in the fall of 1901, Schultz was appointed commander of the  Opyt. Through the efforts of Konstantin Fedorovich and under the guidance of Alexander Popov, the first ship radio room was created as well as various antenna tests. A year later, Schultz organized the equipping of warships of the entire Baltic Fleet with radio cabins. Almost in parallel, similar work began to be carried out in the Pacific squadron, located in Port Arthur. By the beginning of the Russo-Japanese War, the vast majority of Russian warships were equipped with radio communications, and Schultz, moreover, created an organizational and technical justification for the radio communications service in the fleet.

In addition to the radio, Schultz tested on his gunboat a unique counter-mine setting system with an original ignition device he created, which operated from the pressure developed by the explosion of a neighboring counter-mine. Schultz solved the issue of simultaneous detonation of counter mines without conductors. Subsequent experiments showed that countermines with a charge of 216 kg of wet pyroxylin destroyed the hulls of neighboring mines at a distance of up to 60 meters. A number of counter-mines, dropped at intervals of 38 meters, exploded almost simultaneously after the last mine dropped from the side of the ship was blown up by means of a fickford cord. One hundred countermines could reliably clear a passage 0.5 cables wide and two miles long. Like the "Schulz Trawl", the countermine system proposed by Schultz was adopted by the Imperial Russian Navy as early as 1903.

Russo-Japanese War

On January 1, 1904, Schultz was awarded the rank of captain of the 2nd rank, and on January 27, the Russo-Japanese War broke out. On the same day, Vice Admiral Stepan Makarov was appointed commander of the Pacific Squadron. Together with him, the captain of the 2nd rank Mikhail Vasilyev was appointed senior flag officer, and the captain of the 2nd rank Konstantin Schultz, the senior flagship mine officer.

Already on February 5, 1904, Makarov left by train for the Far East. With the arrival on February 24 in Port Arthur, Schulz was entrusted with the responsibility of organizing the mine defense of the fleet. In a short time, he created a detachment of minesweepers, which successfully made passages both in their own and enemy minefields at each exit of the squadron to the open sea. At the same time, the equipment of the ships of the squadron with radio communications was completed at an accelerated pace, radio operators were trained, the first organizational system of radio communications and the procedure for radio exchange were created. On March 7, 1904, prepared by Schultz, for the first time, attention was drawn to the need to maintain secrecy when going on the air, and elementary information on the direction finding of enemy transmitters was also listed. Thus, for the first time and it was in the navy during the Russo-Japanese War, the foundations of radar were laid.

It so happened that, in violation of his own orders, hastily withdrawing the squadron on March 31, 1904, to the aid of the Strashnyy leading an unequal battle, Makarov did not let the minesweeper squad ahead. Matters were made more difficult when he didn't clear the fairway when he was already calmly returning to the inner roadstead of Port Arthur. As a result, the flagship of the squadron, the battleship Petropavlovsk, was blown up by a mine and instantly went under water. More than 650 people died, including the commander of the squadron, Makarov, Vasiliev and Schultz.

Nine years after the tragedy, when the Japanese divers examined the wreck of the Petropavlovsk, the remains of six people were raised. According to one of the two official versions, the remains of one of them belonged to Konstantin Fedorovich von Schultz himself.

Awards
 (1896)
 (1899)
Order of Saint Stanislaus:
III Class (1899)
II Class (1902)  
Order of Saint Anna, III Class (1899)

Foreign awards
: Legion of Honour, Officer (1903)

References

1864 births
1904 deaths
Imperial Russian Navy officers
Russian military personnel of the Russo-Japanese War
People from Saint Petersburg Governorate
People from Kronstadt
Recipients of the Order of St. Anna, 3rd class
Recipients of the Order of Saint Stanislaus (Russian), 2nd class
Recipients of the Order of Saint Stanislaus (Russian), 3rd class
Russian military personnel killed in the Russo-Japanese War
Captains who went down with the ship
Officiers of the Légion d'honneur
Naval Cadet Corps alumni
20th-century Russian photographers